The  oxygen cocktail is a foamy substance containing a beverage drink (juice, milk, etc.) enriched in gaseous oxygen. The drink is used as part of oxygen therapy by a number of Russian medical institutions; their research suggest that the drink, by supplying oxygen, allegedly reduces chronic fatigue syndrome and hypoxia and activates metabolism.

History
The oxygen cocktail was developed in the 1960s by the Russian academician N. N. Sirotinin. While researching the respiratory function of the stomach and the possibility of filling the body with oxygen through the digestive tract, Soviet doctors put probes into the patients' stomachs, through which the body could be filled with up to 2 liters of oxygen. Although the condition of the patients improved considerably, this method had to be abandoned because of discomfort caused by the probes. In an alternative treatment, a foam-forming liquid was filled with oxygen and transferred to the patient's mouth via a tube. Later, researches suggested adding the oxygen foam into food or drink. Such oxygen-enriched drinks received the name “oxygen cocktail” and were produced in sanatoriums and clinics. Since the 1970s, the method of making such drinks has undergone almost no changes, but the foam-forming ingredients and the ways of filling the cocktails with oxygen have been improved.

Ingredients
Juices (grape, cherry, raspberry, etc.), syrups, water, milk and fruit-drinks are often used as the base of the cocktail. Oily and sparkling liquids result in poor homogeneity of the foam. The base liquid might contain extracts of plants and herbs such as hawthorn, strawflower, motherwort and rose hip, which themselves are used in the clinical practices. An essential element of the oxygen cocktail is the foaming agent, such as gelatin egg white or liquorice. Initially, oxygen cocktails were made with egg white. However clinical trials proved that this ingredient resulted in allergenicity and unpleasant taste and could promote infectious diseases; thus it was replaced by liquorice, which is a foaming agent, tonic and sedative.

Mechanism of action
After entering the intestines, the oxygen from the cocktail allegedly absorbs into the blood, where it stimulates metabolism, blood circulation, redox and the immune system. The activated metabolism also stimulates the digesting of other cocktail's ingredients, thereby enhancing their medical action.

Clinical research in Russia
The use of oxygen cocktail for medical rehabilitation was allegedly studied at the gynecological department of medical rehabilitation of the "Research Center of Obstetrics, Gynecology and Perinatology". It was demonstrated that using the oxygen cocktails as a part of the complex therapy of adults, children and teenagers with inflammations of uterine appendages, optimized metabolism and activated antioxidants in the blood plasma, thereby improving the general condition of the patients. This result was confirmed in other Russian clinics.

In 2005 the Research Center of Children's Health (Russian Academy of Medical Sciences) studied the efficiency of the oxygen cocktails as a part of the complex therapy of children and teenagers with chronic diseases of the respiratory and digestive tracts. Patients took 200 mL of the oxygen cocktail per day. It was concluded that the oxygen cocktail activates metabolism, reduces fatigue and stimulates efficiency and the immune system without visible side effects. Improvement was observed for all patients with respiratory diseases and 85% of the children having digestive tract problems. 
The efficiency of the oxygen cocktail in prevention and therapy of placental deficiency and fetal hypoxia was proved during the 2006 study at the obstetrics and gynecology department of the Peoples' Friendship University of Russia.

As a result of these studies, it was suggested that the oxygen cocktail
Reduces fatigue, helps eliminating chronic fatigue syndrome
Improves the sleep
Activates metabolism
Optimizes the respiratory, cardiovascular, nervous and digestive systems.
Stimulates cardial and cerebral circulation
Optimizes the blood sugar concentration, increases the hemoglobin content.
Stimulates the immune system
Facilitates optimal fetal development during pregnancy
Pubmed (as in 2022) gives nine papers on a search query "oxygen cocktail", all are in Russian (and published in Russian journals), four of them have English abstracts. Two of these studies weren't aimed to have control groups, the two others assessed oxygen cocktails in a combination of additional measures that included many other different techniques.

Usage
In Russia, oxygen cocktails are prescribed for expecting mothers, sportsmen, children and teenagers, people living in poor ecological conditions or experiencing hypoxia, cardiovascular system and digestive tract diseases, having problems with the immune system, insomnia, chronic fatigue syndrome and excessive body weight.

The contraindications of the oxygen cocktail are:

Acute bronchial asthma
Gallstones
Status asthmaticus
Hyperthymic temperament
Respiratory failure
Intoxication of the body
Urolithiasis
Peptic ulcer
Allergy to one or more ingredients of the cocktail.
In Ulaanbaatar, Mongolia, people consume Russian branded oxygen cocktails to protect themselves from yearly winter smog, and the Head of a WHO's Department Maria Neira criticized that practice as scientifically unproven.

See also

Adaptogen
Hydrogen peroxide therapy
Hypoxia (medical)
Oxygen therapy
Oxygen concentrator
Oxygen bar
Nitro cold brew coffee

References

Oxygen
Soviet inventions